Daz 4 Zoe is a young-adult novel by Robert Swindells.  It follows the story of Zoe, a 'subbie' (from the suburbs of Silverdale) and Daz a 'chippy' (from the city of Rawhampton). It is a dual dialogue, with parts being written as if by Daz, and parts by Zoe.  Daz's spelling is phonetic with appalling grammar, done by Swindells to show Daz's low quality of education.  This contrasts with Zoe's more formal style. The novel discusses the microcosm of the 'chippies' and the 'subbies' in order to discuss the ridge between the bourgeoisie and the proletariat in a dystopian future where those living in cities do not have suffrage, and the elite suburb-dwellers control the nation.

Plot 
The 'Subbies' live in the suburbs of Silverdale, a large fictional city, whereas the 'Chippies' live in the run-down city. The subbie children like to go out 'chippying' (visiting nightclubs in Rawhampton). This prompts adverts on TV about the dangers of chippying.

Zoe is friends with Tabitha, the daughter of a very wealthy real estate developer.  She encourages Zoe to go chippying with her in the company of Ned and Larry.  Ned drives them to the Blue Moon nightclub, where Daz is as well.  In order to leave the suburb, they tell the guard on duty that they are visiting Zoe's cousin in the next suburb and are made to show their ID cards to the bouncers who guard Silverdale.

Zoe and Daz fall in love when they first set eyes on each other, although, at first, Zoe thinks it may be the 'lobotomizer' (coke, rum and 'a couple of other ingredients') that she has been drinking.

Larry spots an attractive chippy girl and subtly tries to call her over to him.  She smiles out of embarrassment, but he thinks she fancies him.  Eventually, he shouts out to her loudly, his outburst coinciding with a pause in the music.  Her boyfriend picks up a chair and goes over to Larry.  A policeman steps between them.  The chippy throws the chair, which Larry deflects with his arm.  Daz comes over to rescue Zoe, taking Larry by the arm and telling the group to run and save themselves.

When Zoe gets back to Silverdale, she realises that she had fallen in love with Daz and started pining for him. Her Grandma tells her a story of how she once fell in love with Gordon Payne at a young age, but he never noticed her. She warns Zoe that Subbies and Chippies are not meant to be together.

Characters

Darren 'Daz' Barraclough 
Daz is a 'chippy'.  He wants to join 'Dred', a sub-killing gang, to get revenge on the subbies for murdering his brother Del.  He is in the Blue Moon nightclub, speaking to the gang leader, Cal, when he spots Zoe.  When he sees that she is in trouble, he rushes over to help her and, taking Larry by the arm, leads them outside and instructs them to run. Zoe quickly gives a kiss to Daz's cheek.  And from then on, the story unfolds.

Zoe May Askew
Zoe is a 'subby', coming to the Blue Moon nightclub to please her only friend Tabby; she finds herself wondering if all chippies are bad. She wants to please her friends and was mostly a good girl before meeting Daz. When Daz helps her to escape from the Blue Moon nightclub, she kisses him on the cheek and then realises she has fallen in love with him. And the story unfolds from there..

Tabitha "Tabby" Wentworth
Tabby and Zoe are best friends at school whose parents are close colleagues. Her wealthy father founded the very estate the pair live on. She and her family occupy the grand Wentworth House. Secretly, Mr Wentworth is a member of FAIR (Fraternal Alliance for Integration through Reunification) until he is found out and becomes a 'kickout' (he must leave the suburbs).

References 

1990 British novels
1990 children's books
British young adult novels
Hamish Hamilton books